was a Japanese modernist artist who worked first in oils, and then from 1950 in the woodblock print medium. From the beginning of his career, he broadened the range of styles and techniques used by Yoshida family artists.

Family
His father and mother, Hiroshi Yoshida and Fujio Yoshida, were both leading Western-style artists in Tokyo in oils, watercolors, and from 1925 in shin-hanga woodblock prints. Hodaka's older brother, Tōshi Yoshida, became the heir to the Yoshida Studio and worked in both oils and woodblock prints. Hodaka was supposed to become a scientist, but as the Second World War ended, he defied his father's plans and became, not only an artist, but one who focused on abstraction, a style his father disdained. (Skibbe, 11-12) Unlike others in the family, Hodaka's art is quite complex, with an "edgy" feel to it. (Robertson, 114)

Analysis of his work 
Instead of having a straight line development, his work moved forward in a series of abrupt stages. For example, his 1955 encounter in Mexico with primitive Pre-Columbian artifacts and architecture radically reoriented his art. A survey of the total range of his work - about 600 prints over 45 years - reveals distinct periods, each having major changes in subject matter, vocabulary, style, and color palette. His styles, while always his own, drew from Expressionism, Pop, Photorealism, and Color Field abstraction. (Allen, et al., 114-119) Broadly speaking most of his prints would be categorized as sōsaku-hanga.

Main periods:

1950-53 Early Prints - simple modern observations of nature and human nature

1953-54 Buddhist Prints - modern reformulations of traditional Japanese material culture

1955-63 Primitive Prints - abstractions of the primitive in Pre-Columbian forms

1963-66 Folk Prints (Transition A) - witty perspectives on indigenous South American culture

1966-74 Mythology and Landscape Prints - Pop art exposé of modern culture in decline

1974-79 House and Nude Prints (Transition B) - the tension aroused by premodern/modern

1979-84 FMC House Prints - the basic human element in houses from various cultures

1984-91 Recollection Prints (Transition C) - noting old and distressed objects

1991-95 Wall Prints - the human story on the surfaces of old walls

The print technology Hodaka used was not limited to woodblock, but included monoprinting, wood engraving, copper etching, silkscreen, lithograph, and often employed photo-transfer techniques. In this regard he was a pioneer in Japan in the 1960s and 70's. (Allen, et al., 114-117) His subject matter was drawn from objects in cultures all around the world. In spite of these various dynamics, each of Hodaka's periods is an exploration in the same basic direction, into what might be called modernist expressions of primitive human vitality. (Robertson, 114; Skibbe, 47-49) Individual prints show great artistry in composition and color.

Modernist 
In Chapter One of his book, A Fine Disregard: What Makes Modern Art Modern, 1990, Kirk Varnedoe says that modern art has four basic characteristics: (1) the flattened image instead of the illusion of space, (2) fragmentation and repetition in the composition, rather than the complete object, (3) primitivism, in the sense of an artifact revealing something latent deep within ourselves, and (4) the flight of the mind, the freedom to assume any point of departure, or to conceptualize as one wishes. Hodaka’s art exemplifies all four characteristics, and he did this without suppressing his Japanese aesthetic sensibility. Hodaka clearly was a modern Japanese internationalist, and as such he broadened the artistic heritage of the Yoshida family. (www.hodakayoshidaprints.com)

He exhibited mainly in major international art biennials. Hodaka received many awards and prizes, including the Purple Ribbon Decoration bestowed by the Emperor in 1990, and the Order of the Rising Sun, Fourth class, awarded by the Emperor posthumously in 1995. (Skibbe, 20)

Hodaka's wife, Chizuko Yoshida, née Inoue, (1924-) and their daughter Ayomi Yoshida (1958-) are both artists, and their son Takasuke (1959-) is an art jewelry maker. (Allen, 10)

References
Homma Masayoshi “Yoshida Hodaka no hanga,” in Hangakan 8 (1984), 29-40
Yoshida Hodaka Hangatan, Vol. 3, Shûzô sakka, Machida Shiritsu Kokusai Hanga Bijutsukan, 1988
Skibbe, Eugene M. Yoshida Hodaka: The Magic of Art, Seascape, 1997
Allen, Laura, et al. A Japanese Legacy: Four Generations of Yoshida Family Artists, Minneapolis Institute of Arts, 2002.
Web site at http://www.hodakayoshidaprints.com

Japanese printmakers
1926 births
1995 deaths
Sosaku hanga artists
20th-century Japanese painters
20th-century printmakers